Grant Waterman (born 10 November 1971) is an Australian water polo player who competed in the 2000 Summer Olympics.

References

External links
 

1971 births
Living people
Australian male water polo players
Olympic water polo players of Australia
Water polo players at the 2000 Summer Olympics